Kenneth Samuel Kleinknecht (July 24, 1919 in Washington, D.C. – November 20, 2007) worked for the  United States National Advisory Committee on Aeronautics as an engineer and continued at NASA to become a manager of the Mercury, Gemini, Apollo CSM, Skylab, Shuttle, and Spacelab.  After retiring from NASA, he worked for Lockheed Martin for 9 years.

References

NASA people
Mechanical engineers
1919 births
2007 deaths
Place of death missing
Lockheed Martin people
20th-century American engineers